Natore-3 is a constituency represented in the Jatiya Sangsad (National Parliament) of Bangladesh since 2008 by Zunaid Ahmed Palak of the Awami League.

Boundaries 
The constituency encompasses Singra Upazila.

History 
The constituency was created in 1984 from a Rajshahi constituency when the former Rajshahi District was split into four districts: Nawabganj, Naogaon, Rajshahi, and Natore.

Members of Parliament

Elections

Elections in the 2010s

Elections in the 2000s

Elections in the 1990s 

Kazi Golam Morshed of the BNP was elected in a January 1995 by-election.

References

External links
 

Parliamentary constituencies in Bangladesh
Natore District